Acacia angustifolia can refer to either of the following:
 Acacia angustifolia (Jacq.) H. L. Wendland—a synonym of Acacia suaveolens (Sm.) Willd.
 Acacia angustifolia Lodd.—a synonym of Acacia floribunda (Vent.) Willd.

See also
 Senegalia angustifolia (Lam.) Britton & Rose